Gabriela Asturias Ruiz (Guatemala City, July 13, 1995) is a Guatemalan neuroscientist dedicated to the popularization of science. Her scientific contributions are focused on reducing chronic malnutrition rates in Guatemala and since 2020, Asturias has led a group of doctors, anthropologists, and engineers in the creation of the "Automated Logistics Medical Assistant" known as "ALMA" with the purpose of supporting the consultations of the COVID-19 population and coordinating the response of the health system. In 2020, she was recognized by MIT as one of the 35 young innovators under 35 in Latin America.

Scientific career
She graduated with a Bachelor of Science degree in medicine with a specialty in Neuroscience from Trinity College of Arts and Sciences, Duke University, and later from Stanford University School of Medicine|Stanford University. In 2013, she obtained the position of research assistant in the Laboratory of Perception, Performance, and Psychophysiology, of the Department of Psychiatry and Behavioral Sciences in the School of Medicine of that same university. The following year she obtained the position of research assistant in the Brain Stimulation Laboratory, of the same department. She went on to work for two years as a research assistant in the Neurobiology Group of the National Institute of Environmental Health in Durham, NC.

In 2015, she began working with Enrique Azmitia and David Boyd from the Global Health Institute on a study on chronic malnutrition in Guatemala. Asturias and Boyd created the Guatemalan Education and Health Development Foundation (Fundación Desarrolla Guatemala para la Educación y Salud - FUNDEGUA). It was through this foundation that Asturias became a scientific communicator and mentor to fifteen professional women so that they learned how to conduct research and work in programs for the economic development of the country.

Scientific dissemination
In 2016, she completed her internship as a research assistant at the National Institutes of Health and National Institutes of Mental Health, Bethesda, and the following year she obtained an analyst position through the PEER Program in Washington, D.C. During that year, she created the IGNITE program with Dr. Nimmi Ramanujam with the aim of empowering women in the STEM area, reaching 1,602 Guatemalan students.

In 2020, she coordinated the creation and launch of the Children's TV Program "Enciéndete" (Ignite), in alliance with Sésamo, Jayro Bustamante, La Casa de la Producción, Gaby Moreno, Yahaira Tubac and the Guatemorfosis Foundation. This program is a Guatemalan production that aims to integrate children from all over the country and from different ethnic groups. The objective is to open a space led by children and for children that answers questions related to COVID-19.

Within FUNDEGUA, she also leads the Conéctate Guate project, in collaboration with SESAN, Wuqu’Kawoq, Duke University, and the Academy of Nutrition and Dietetics. This project seeks to create an open data map of all organizations in Guatemala working to reduce chronic malnutrition rates. This initiative continues to be promoted each year with SESAN. The gender approach in ALMA is used to empower women to improve access to health services.

Honors
 2019 - Winner of the Stanford University Medical Scholarship to lead a study on mental health services in Guatemala for 1.5 years
 2016 - Selected to present in the Social Impact Lab at the 14th Annual Conference on Global Health and Innovation by Unite for Sight at Yale University
 2016 - Selected as a 2016 delegate for the US-Mexico Forum on Cooperation, Understanding, and Solidarity at Stanford and ITAM universities, winner in the final at Stanford 2016, Honorable mention in the Untold Stories contest by Global Health NOW and the Consortium of Universities for Global Health.
 2020 - Selected Visionary among 35 Innovators Under 35 in Latin America by MIT Technology Review | Estrategia y Negocios | Prensa Libre | El Periódico
 2020 - Winner of $500K from the Centers for Disease Control and Prevention (CDC) to scale the ALMA System in Guatemala over 2 years | FUNDEGUA
 2020 - Winner of funding within the STTR mechanism for Phase 1 and 2 of the National Institute of Mental Health for $1.2M over 2.5 years focused on increasing access to mental health services for university students in the United States | MiResource.
 2020 - Winner of the scholarship for Innovative Solutions of COVID-19 from the Inter-American Development Bank for the ALMA System for $100K for 1 year | FUNDEGUA
 2020 - Winner of the Open Innovation Challenge on COVID-19 granted by the National Secretariat of Science and Technology (SENACYT) and Vice Presidency of Guatemala for the ALMA System | FUNDEGUA
 2020 - Recognized by MIT as one of the 35 young innovators under 35 in Latin America.

References

External links
 Profile on OWSD
 FUNDEGUA website

Living people
1995 births
20th-century women
21st-century women
Guatemalan women scientists
Women neuroscientists